The 2014 National Camogie League, known for sponsorship reasons as the Irish Daily Star National Camogie League, commenced in February 2014 and was won by Kilkenny.

References

League
National Camogie League seasons